Poisoned by Love: The Kern County Murders, also known as, Murder So Sweet, (1993) is an American TV movie starring Harry Hamlin and Helen Shaver that aired on CBS on February 2, 1993.  It is based on the real-life murders carried out by Steven David Catlin that occurred in Bakersfield, California in the 1980s.

Plot
Steve Catlin was known as a real lady-killer. But it's his new bride's mysterious death that causes his former wife, Edie Ballew, to question how accurate that nickname really is. With little more than a hunch and the help of an out-of-town detective, Edie secretly pieces together clues that reveal her cunning and smooth-talking ex-husband as a cold, methodical killer.

References

External links
 https://www.imdb.com/title/tt0107844/?ref_=ttmd_md_nm

1993 films
1993 television films
1990s biographical films
Biographical films about serial killers
CBS network films
Films directed by Larry Peerce
Films scored by Steve Dorff
Films set in the 1980s
Films set in California
Cultural depictions of male serial killers
Cultural depictions of American men